Olivier Coquelin, nicknamed “Disco Daddy,” was a French expatriate entrepreneur and nightclub promoter.  He opened Le Club, the first American discotheque, on New Year’s Eve 1960, on East 55th Street in Manhattan.By 1962, The New York Times, discussing and defining the new term "jet-set," used Coquelin and members of Le Club as paradigmatic examples. 

In 1966, together with business partner Borden Stevenson, son of politician Adlai Stevenson, he opened Cheetah, a three-story disco on Broadway near 53rd Streetwith satellite locations following in New Jersey, Chicago and Los Angeles.In 1970, he opened Hippopotamus on East 54th Street.  New York Magazine reported that Hippopotamus was "heir to the discotheque crown," attracting "literary lions like George Plimpton and eagles of wealth and politics like Onassis and Edward Kennedy," and featured a 2,400 square foot dance floor where one might find "transvestites in stretch jumpsuits unbuttoned provocatively to the waist, girls in stainless steel blouses, and men in ankle-length curly white lamb coats."

By 1977, Hippopotamus had moved to East 62nd Street, where Coquelin added a Brazilian-themed nightclub upstairs from the disco, called Cachaça.The opening occasioned a full profile of Coquelin in Andy Warhol's Interview Magazine.

References

Businesspeople from New York City
Nightlife in New York City
Nightclub owners